Road 15 is two segments of roadways in Western Iran. 
The northern segment opened in the year 2011. This road connects the city of Ardabil to Tehran - Tabriz Freeway, thus providing a direct connection from Ardabil to Tehran and beyond. 

The southern segment is a road in Iranian Kurdistan connecting Kermanshah to Paveh, Marivan and Saqez. Some parts of the Marivan-Saqez road are currently unpaved. The infrastructure of the road is currently being updated, with landscaping and paving projects underway.

See also
 Road sign marking Highway number 15 North towards Khalkhal and Ardabil on Zanjan - Tabriz Freeway: Link

References

External links 

 Iran road map on Young Journalists Club

Roads in Iran